The Hawkeye 10 Conference is a high school athletic conference in Iowa made up of larger-mid-size schools in Southwest Iowa. Most members participate at the 3A level in all sports, which is the second highest level of competition in Iowa.

List of member schools

*Heartland Christian School, located in Council Bluffs, co-ops with St. Albert Catholic for baseball, football, cheer, and softball. Heartland Christian competes in other sports in the Frontier Conference of Nebraska.

Former member schools

In 2013, Corning and Villisca entered a joint operation agreement and are known as the Southwest Valley Timberwolves, competing in the Pride of Iowa Conference.

 *Classifications for football are set for two-year cycles with enrollment numbers from grades 9-11 from the school year before the cycle begins. For all other sports, enrollment numbers from grades 10-12 are used to determine classes for the current school year.

Conference History
In 1930, Creston approached Little Ten Conference members Atlantic, Clarinda, Red Oak, Shenandoah, and Villisca about breaking away from the conference to create their own league. The conference at the time consisted of those schools plus Bedford, Corning, Glenwood, and Sidney. During a meeting in Villisca on February 15, 1930, the schools decided to make it official. Soon after, The Little Six named was changed to the Hawkeye Six.

The 1930 track meet at Red Oak was the first official event, with Shenandoah claiming the first title in league history. Creston and Red Oak would tie for the football conference championship in the fall of '30.

In 1946 the conference went through their first phase of expansion when Corning was admitted, making the conference the Hawkeye Seven. Glenwood would follow in 1951, making it the Hawkeye Eight.

In 1962, Villisca withdrew from the conference to found the Tall Corn Conference, and Council Bluffs, Abraham Lincoln applied for membership, but was denied. Harlan would be invited at this time, but turned down an invitation to stay in the Midwest Conference.

In the fall of 1963, Lewis Central applied for membership, but was denied. The same happened in 1966 when St. Albert's Catholic and Maryville, Missouri both applied for membership and were denied.

Moving forward to 1968, Corning announced they would be leaving the conference in 1970 for the Tall Corn Conference as well. Lewis Central was soon admitted in 1970, and Harlan the following year.

The conference was known as the Hawkeye Eight until 1993 when Kuemper Catholic and Denison, recently partnered with Schelswig, joined. Beginning in the fall of 2013, St. Albert's Catholic finally became a member school as well, giving the conference 11 schools.

In 2017, the Missouri River Conference sent letters inviting both Lewis Central and Glenwood to join. Both schools declined.

While the conference no longer sponsors football due to Iowa's district system, Harlan Community is one of the most storied football programs in the nation, having won 13 class 3A state titles since Iowa began the football playoff system in 1972. Harlan claimed titles in 1972, 1982, 1983, 1984, 1993, 1995, 1997, 1998, 2003, 2004, 2005, 2009, 2021, and 2022. Harlan holds the longest regular-season game winning streak (excludes post-season games) in Iowa high school football history, winning 66 straight games from 1985-1992. In addition, legendary coach Curt Bladt is the second winningest coach in state history, posting an unheard of 407-60 record in his career. Coach Bladt trails the all-time leader Dick Tighe by just 25 games despite the fact that Tighe coached for 63 years and Bladt has only coached for 40. Bladt has earned the honor of National High School Coach of the Year by the National High School Athletic Association, twice, and is also immortalized in a book titled Let the Chips Fall Where They May. Thanks to state titles held in Men's Basketball, Wrestling, and Baseball in recent years Harlan was also one of the finalist for ESPN's top High School Sport town in recent years.

State Champions

State Team Championships Since Joining Hawkeye 10

Wrestling

There is a strong history of wrestling in the conference with four separate schools having won state team championships since Glenwood won the conference's first in 1989. Lewis Central leads the way, having won state titles in 2001, '04, and '06.

References

External links
 Official site
 Conference History

High school sports in Iowa
Sports leagues established in 1930
1930 establishments in Iowa